Dolores Della Penna (December 13, 1954 – July 12, 1972) was a school girl from Philadelphia who was tortured, murdered by dismemberment, and beheaded in the Kensington neighborhood in July, 1972.

Disappearance
Shortly before midnight on July 11, 1972, Della Penna was abducted from her home in Philadelphia. Witnesses later informed the police that they had seen her beaten and dragged, while she was unconscious, into a car. Della Penna's torso and arms were later located in Jackson Township, New Jersey. Her legs were found in adjacent Manchester Township, New Jersey. Her head was never recovered and her murder remains unsolved.

Investigation and aftermath 
Her fingertips had been severed from her hands to prevent the police from identifying her. Their reports state that Della Penna was killed by drug dealers who thought that her boyfriend had stolen drugs from them. The crime remains unsolved, and is hotly debated online.

See also
Crime in Philadelphia
List of murdered American children
List of solved missing person cases
List of unsolved murders

References

External links
Gory Killing Of '72 Solved, Sources Say Arrests Sought In Case That Obsessed Police, The Philadelphia Inquirer (July 10, 1996)
Gruesome killing remains unsolved, The Philadelphia Inquirer (April 13, 2003)

1970s in Philadelphia
1970s missing person cases
1972 murders in the United States
American torture victims
Crimes in Philadelphia
Deaths by person in Pennsylvania
Female murder victims
Formerly missing people
History of women in Pennsylvania
Incidents of violence against girls
July 1972 events in the United States
July 1972 crimes
Kensington, Philadelphia
Missing person cases in Pennsylvania
Murdered American children
People murdered in Pennsylvania
Rapes in the United States
Unsolved murders in the United States